A hammam or Turkish bath is a type of steam bath or a place of public bathing associated with the Islamic world. It is a prominent feature in the culture of the Muslim world and was inherited from the model of the Roman thermae. Muslim bathhouses or hammams were historically found across the Middle East, North Africa, al-Andalus (Islamic Spain and Portugal), Central Asia, the Indian subcontinent, and in Southeastern Europe under Ottoman rule. A variation on the Muslim bathhouse, the Victorian Turkish bath, became popular as a form of therapy, a method of cleansing, and a place for relaxation during the Victorian era, rapidly spreading through the British Empire, the United States of America, and Western Europe.

In Islamic cultures the significance of the hammam was both religious and civic: it provided for the needs of ritual ablutions but also provided for general hygiene in an era before private plumbing and served other social functions such as offering a gendered meeting place for men and for women. Archeological remains attest to the existence of bathhouses in the Islamic world as early as the Umayyad period (7th–8th centuries) and their importance has persisted up to modern times. Their architecture evolved from the layout of Roman and Greek bathhouses and featured a regular sequence of rooms: an undressing room, a cold room, a warm room, and a hot room. Heat was produced by furnaces which provided hot water and steam, while smoke and hot air was channeled through conduits under the floor.

In a modern hammam visitors undress themselves, while retaining some sort of modesty garment or loincloth, and proceed into progressively hotter rooms, inducing perspiration. They are then usually washed by male or female staff (matching the gender of the visitor) with the use of soap and vigorous rubbing, before ending by washing themselves in warm water. Unlike in Roman or Greek baths, bathers usually wash themselves with running water instead of immersing themselves in standing water since this is a requirement of Islam, though immersion in a pool used to be customary in the hammams of some regions such as Iran. While hammams everywhere generally operate in fairly similar ways, there are some regional differences both in usage and architecture.

Etymology 
The word "hammam" is a noun meaning "bath", "bathroom", "bathhouse", "swimming pool", etc. derived from the Arabic triconsonantal root ح م م which yields meanings related to heat or heating. This is also the root of the word al-ḥamma meaning hot spring, origin of the name of the Alfama neighborhood in Lisbon. From Arabic , it passed on to Persian and Turkish. The first recorded use of the term 'Turkish bath' in English was in 1644.

History

Origins and early development

Greek and Roman era 

Public bathhouses were a prominent civic and urban institution in Roman and Hellenistic culture and were found throughout the Mediterranean world. They remained important in the cities of the early Byzantine Empire up to around the mid-6th century, after which the construction of new bathhouses declined and existing ones were gradually abandoned.

Early Muslim era 

Following the expansion of Arab Muslim rule over much of the Middle East and North Africa in the 7th and 8th centuries, the emerging Islamic societies were quick to adapt the hammam to their own needs. Its importance to Muslim society lay in the religious requirement to perform ablutions (wudu and ghusl) before praying and because of the general Islamic emphasis on physical and spiritual purity, although the scholar Mohammed Hocine Benkheira has argued that hammams were not in fact necessary for religious purposes in early Islam and that this relationship was partly assumed by later historians. He suggests that the hammam's initial appeal derived at least in part from its convenience for other services (such as shaving), from its endorsement by some Muslim doctors as a form of therapy, and from the continued popular appreciation of its pleasures in a region where they had already existed for centuries. He also notes that there was initially strong opposition from many Islamic scholars (ulama), especially Maliki scholars, to the use of hammams. These scholars viewed hammams as unnecessary for full-body ablutions (ghusl) and questioned whether public bathing spaces could be sufficiently clean to achieve proper purification. They also worried that spaces for collective bathing could become spaces for illicit sexual activity. Nevertheless, this opposition progressively faded and by the 9th century most scholars were no longer interested in debating the validity of hammams, although it continued to be seen with suspicion in some conservative circles.

The earliest known Islamic hammams were built in Syria and Jordan during the Umayyad Caliphate (661–750) as part of palaces and desert castles at Qusayr 'Amra, Hammam al-Sarah, Qasr al-Hayr al-Sharqi, and Khirbat al-Majfar. Shortly after this period, archaeology reveals the existence of Islamic bathhouses across much of the Muslim world, with hammams appearing as far west as Volubilis (itself a former Roman colony) in Morocco during the Idrisid period (late 8th to early 9th centuries). Historical texts and archeological evidence also indicate the existence of hammams in Cordoba and other cities of al-Andalus in the 8th century. In Iran, which did not previously have a strong culture of public bathing, historical texts mention the existence of bathhouses in the 10th century as well as the use of hot springs for therapeutic purposes; however, there has been relatively little archeological investigation to document the early presence and development of hammams in this region.

Muslims retained many of the main elements of the classical bathhouses while leaving out functions which were less relevant to their practices. For example, the progression from cold room to hot room was maintained, but it was no longer common practice to take a plunge in cold water after leaving the hot room, nor was exercise incorporated into bathing culture as it was in classical gymnasiums. Likewise, Muslim bathers usually washed themselves in running water rather than immersing themselves in standing water. Although in early Islamic history women did not normally patronise hammams, by around the 10th century many places started to provide separate hours (or separate facilities) for men and women. The hammam then took on an important role in women's social life as one of the few public spaces where they could gather and socialise apart from men. Some hammams were privately owned or formed parts of palaces and mansions, but in many cases they were civic or charitable institutions which formed part of larger religious/civic complexes. Such complexes were governed by waqf agreements, and hammams often acted as a source of revenue for the upkeep of other institutions such as mosques.

Later Islamic baths 
In the 11th century the Seljuk Empire conquered much of Anatolia from the Byzantine Empire, eventually leading to the complete conquest of the remnants of the old empire in the 15th century. During those centuries of war, peace, alliance, trade and competition, these intermixing cultures (Eastern Roman, Islamic Persian and Turkic) had tremendous influence on each other.

Later the Ottomans became prolific patrons of hammams. Since they were social centres as well as baths, they were built in almost every city across their European, Asian, and African territories. The Ottomans were thus responsible for introducing hammams to much of eastern and central Europe, where many still exist today in various states of restoration or disrepair. Such Turkish baths are found as far as Bosnia and Herzegovina, Greece, and Hungary. Many early Ottoman hammams survive in Bursa and Edirne, as well as in Eastern Europe and Anatolia, but hammams became even more numerous and architecturally ambitious in Constantinople (Istanbul), thanks to its royal patronage, its large population and its access to plentiful water. The city's Greek inhabitants had retained a strong Eastern Roman bath culture, with the Baths of Zeuxippus constituting one early example. Ottoman architects expanded on the experience of Byzantine architects to create particularly well-balanced designs with greater symmetry and regularity in the arrangement of space than could be seen in hammams in other parts of the Muslim world. Some of the city's oldest monumental hammams are the Tahtakale Hamam (probably built right after 1454), the Mahmut Pasha Hamam (built in 1466), and the Bayezid II Hamam (built some time between 1500 and 1507). The monumental hammams designed by the 16th-century Ottoman architect Mimar Sinan (1489–1588), such as the Çemberlitaş Hamamı, the Süleymaniye Hamam (in the complex of the Süleymaniye Mosque), and the Haseki Hürrem Sultan Hamam, are major examples of hammams that were built later in the era of classical Ottoman architecture. When Sultan Mustafa III issued a decree halting the construction of new public baths in the city in 1768, it seems to have resulted in an increase in the number of private hammams among the wealthy and the elites, especially in the Bosphorus suburbs where they built luxurious summer homes.

In Iran, many examples of hammams survive from the Safavid period (16th–18th centuries) onward, with the historic city of Isfahan in particular containing many examples. The spread of Muslim rule in the Indian subcontinent also introduced hammams to this region, with many examples surviving in Mughal architecture (16th–19th centuries).

Contemporary era 
Hammams continued to be a vital part of urban life in the Muslim world until the early 20th century when the spread of indoor plumbing in private homes rendered public baths unnecessary for personal hygiene. This has resulted in a decline in their use – although to varying degrees depending on regional cultural practices. In many regions hammams have been  abandoned, demolished or converted to serve as commercial buildings or cultural venues. Some have been converted into museums or art galleries, as with the examples of the Bayezid II Hamam in Istanbul, which now houses a hammam museum, and the Davud Pasha (or Daut Pasha) Hamam in Skopje, North Macedonia.

In Turkey many historic hammams continue to operate either for locals or for tourists; in some cases this has led to neglected historic hammams such as the Kılıç Ali Pasa Hamamı and the Hürrem Sultan Hamamı being renovated and returned to their original function, while others were abandoned or repurposed. In Morocco, many hammams continue to serve locals in historic cities such as Fes and Marrakesh, where they are especially useful to the urban poor residing in the old cities (medinas). In many other regions, however, hammams have become obsolete and have either been abandoned or converted to other uses. In Iran, some baths continue to operate in the historic districts of cities like Isfahan where they continue to serve religious functions, but there is an overall decline in their numbers. Many surviving Iranian examples have been converted to other uses, most notably as restaurants and teahouses. In Damascus, Syria, only thirteen hammams were still operating in 2004, mostly in the old city; many others had been either demolished or repurposed. Cairo in Egypt contained an estimated 77 operational hammams at the beginning of the 19th century but only eight were still in business by the start of the 21st century, with many others abandoned or neglected. In the former European territories of the Ottoman Empire such as Greece and the Balkans many hammams became defunct or were neglected in modern times, although some have now been restored and turned into historic monuments or cultural centres.

Public bathing in the Islamic context

Prayer is one of the Five Pillars of Islam and it is customary to perform ablutions before praying. The two Islamic forms of ablution are ghusl, a full-body cleansing, and wudu, a cleansing of the face, hands, and feet. In the absence of water, cleansing with pure soil or sand is also permissible. Mosques always provide a place to wash, but hammams are often located nearby for deeper cleansing. Many are actually part of mosque complexes.

Hammams, particularly in Morocco, evolved from their Roman origins to meet the needs of ritual purification according to Islam. For example, in most Roman-style hammams, there was a cold pool for submersion of the body, a style of bathing that finds less favour with Islam which regards bathing under running water without being fully submerged more appropriate.

Al-Ghazali, a prominent Muslim theologian of the 11th century, wrote Revival of the Religious Sciences, a multi-volume work discussing the appropriate forms of conduct for many aspects of Muslim life and death. One of the volumes, entitled The Mysteries of Purity, details the proper technique for performing ablutions before prayer and the major ablution (ghusil) after anything which renders it necessary, such as the emission of semen. For al-Ghazali, the hammam is a primarily male institution, and he cautions that women should only enter a hammam after childbirth or illness. However, even al-Ghazali thought it admissible for men to prohibit their wives or sisters from using the hammam. For al-Ghazali the main point of contention surrounding hammams was nakedness, and he warned that overt nakedness was to be avoided ("… he should shield it from the sight of others and second, guard against the touch of others.")  His writing focused especially on the need to avoid touching the penis during bathing and after urination, and wrote that nakedness was decent only when the area between a man's knees and  lower stomach was hidden. For women he suggested that only exposure of the face and palms was appropriate. According to al-Ghazali, nakedness in the hammam could incite indecent thoughts and behaviours, hence its controversial nature.

In Islam ritual ablution is also required before or after sexual intercourse. Knowing that, May Telmissany, a professor at the University of Ottawa, argues that the image of a hyper-sexualised woman leaving the hammam is an Orientalist way of looking at things that sees leaving or attending the hammam as an indicator of sexual behaviour.

Bathing practices and services 
Most hammams expect their clients to undress down to a modesty garment or loincloth, before proceeding from a cold room to progressively hotter rooms. There men are usually washed by male bath attendants and women by female attendants before they are given a massage. Some details of the process vary from region to region, such as the presence or absence of pools where visitors can immerse themselves in water. In more conservative areas women are less likely to bathe in just their underwear while in areas where hammams have become the preserve mainly of tourists there is more likelihood that women will bathe naked. Some hammam complexes contain separate sections for men and women; elsewhere men and women are admitted at different times in which case the hours for women are usually far more limited than those for men.

Traditionally hammams, especially those for women, doubled as places of entertainment with dancing and food being shared. It was common to visit hammams before weddings or religious holidays, to celebrate births, to swap beauty trips, etc. Women also used visits to the hammam to size up potential wives for their sons.

Some accessories from Roman times survive in modern hammams, such as the peştemal (a special cloth of silk and/or cotton to cover the body, like a pareo) and the kese (a rough mitten used for scrubbing). However, other accoutrements of the hammam experience such as jewel boxes, gilded soap boxes, mirrors, metal henna bowls, perfume bottles and nalın (wooden or mother-of-pearl clogs that prevented slipping on the wet floor) can now only be seen in museums.

Traditionally, the bathhouse masseurs (Turkish: tellak) were young men who soaped and scrubbed their clients. However, the tellaks were replaced by adult attendants during the 20th century.

Massage 

A massage in a Turkish bath is likely to involve not just vigorous muscle kneading, but also joint cracking - "not so much a tender working of the flesh as a pummelling, a cracking of joints, a twisting of limbs". Hammams aiming for a tourist clientele are likely to also offer an array of different types of massage similar to what might be offered in a spa.

Social function: gendered social space 
Arab hammams are gendered spaces where being a woman or a man can make someone included or a representative of the "other" respectively. Therefore, they represent a departure from the public sphere in which one is physically exposed amongst other women or men. This declaration of sexuality merely by being nude makes hammams a site of gendered expression. One exception to this gender segregation is the presence of young boys who often accompany their mothers until they reach the age of five or six when they switch to attending the male hammam with their fathers.

Women's hammams play a special role in society. Valerie Staats finds that the women's hammams of Morocco serve as a social space where traditional and modern women from urban and rural areas of the country come together, regardless of their religiosity, to bathe and socialise. The bathing regulations laid down by al-Ghazali and other Islamic intellectuals are not usually upheld in the everyday interactions of Moroccans in the hammam. Staats argues that hammams are places where women can feel more at ease than in many other public interactions. In addition, in his work Sexuality in Islam, Abdelwahab Bouhdiba cites the hammam as a place where homosexual encounters in general can take place. He notes that some historians found evidence of hammams as spaces for sexual expression among women, which they believed was a result of the universality of nudity in these spaces. Hammams have also been associated with male homosexuality over the centuries and up to the present day.

Architecture

General design 
The hammam combines the functionality and structural elements of the Roman thermae with the Islamic tradition of steam bathing, ritual cleansing and respect for water. Islamic bathhouses were often constructed as a part of mosque complexes which acted as both community centres and places of worship.

Although there were variations across different regions and periods, the general plan and architectural principles of hammams were very similar. They consisted of a sequence of rooms which bathers visited in the same order: the changing room or undressing room (corresponding to the Roman apodyterium), the cold room (like the Roman frigidarium), the warm room (like the tepidarium), and the hot room (like the caldarium). The nomenclature for these different rooms varied from region to region. The changing room was known generally as al-mashlaḥ or al-maslakh in Arabic, or by local vernacular terms like goulsa in Fez (Morocco) and maḥras in Tunisia, whereas it was known as the camekân in Turkish and the sarbineh in Persian. The cold room was known as the bayt al-barid in al-Andalus, el-barrani in Fez, bayt awwal in Cairo, and soğukluk in Turkish. The warm room or intermediate room was known as bayt al-wastani in al-Andalus and many other regions, as el-wasti in Fez, as bīt əs-skhūn in Tunis, and as ılıklık in Turkish. The hot room was called the bayt al-sakhun in al-Andalus, ad-dakhli in Fez, harara in Cairo, garmkhaneh in Persian, and hararet or sıcaklık in Turkish.

The main chambers of the hammam were usually covered with vaulted or domed ceilings, giving them a distinctive profile. The domes and vaults of the steam rooms (especially the hot room) were usually pierced with small holes or skylights which provided natural light during the day while allowing excess steam to escape. The ceiling and walls were clad with steam-proof materials such as varnished plaster or (for the lower walls and floors) marble. The vestibule, or changing room, was often one of the most highly decorated chambers, featuring a central fountain surrounded by benches. In Ottoman baths, the main changing room often offered multi-level wooden galleries giving access to smaller changing rooms. Toilets or latrines were often included in the complex.

Most historic hammams made use of some version or derivation of the Roman hypocaust underfloor system for heating. A furnace or set of furnaces were located in a service room behind the walls of the hot room and set at a lower level than the steam rooms. The furnaces were used to heat water (usually in a large cauldron above them) which was then delivered to the steam rooms. At the same time, hot air and smoke from the furnaces was channeled through pipes or conduits under the floor of the steam rooms, thus heating the rooms, before rising through the walls and out the chimneys. As hot water was constantly needed, they were kept burning throughout the hours of operation. Although wood was continuously needed for fuel, some hammams, such as those in Morocco, Turkey and Damascus, also made use of recycled organic materials from other industries such as wood shavings from carpenters' workshops and olive pits from the olive presses.

Some hammams were "double" hammams, having separate facilities for women and men. Several of Istanbul's larger hammams were like this, including the Bayezid II Hamam and the Haseki Hürrem Sultan Hamam. Unusually for Morocco, the Hammam as-Saffarin in Fes is another example.

Variations

Maghreb and al-Andalus 
Regional variations in hammam architecture usually relate to the relative proportions of each room or the absence of one type of room. In the Maghreb, and especially in al-Andalus, the largest and most important steam room was typically the warm room (al-wastani). The Arab Baths of Jaén is one of the more extreme examples of this since the warm room is as large as both the cold and hot rooms combined, possibly because it was also used for body massages and other services. The changing room was also fairly large and was typically the only space to feature any significant architectural decoration.

Ottoman baths 
In Ottoman baths the cold room is often either omitted completely or combined with the changing room (known as the camekân or soyunmalık). This room is often the largest domed chamber in the complex, with the dome supported on squinches, "Turkish triangles", or decorative muqarnas. It usually features a central fountain (şadırvan) and is ringed with wooden galleries and is used as a place to relax, drink tea, coffee, or sherbet, and socialise before and after bathing. In contrast with hammams in al-Andalus or the Maghreb, the warm room (ılıklık) was de-emphasised architecturally and was sometimes little more than a transition space between the cold and hot rooms.

The hot room (hararet or sıcaklık) was usually the focus of the richest architectural embellishments. Its layout typically consisted of a central domed space flanked by up to four iwans to form a cruciform layout. The corners between these iwans are often occupied by smaller domed chambers, or halvets, which were used for private bathing. The center was usually occupied by a large heated marble table (göbektaşı or navel stone) for customers to lie on.

Iran 
In Iran a shared pool or basin of hot water is commonly present in the middle of the hot room where bathers could immerse themselves, a feature which was rare or absent in the hamams of other regions (except Egypt). Iranian hammam architecture was also characterised by the polyhedral shape of its rooms (sometimes rectangular but often octagonal or hexagonal), which were covered by a dome with a central skylight. The Iranian hot room (garmkhaneh) was in some cases divided into several rooms: a large main one with a central pool (chal howz) and smaller ones for individual ablutions or which could be used as private rooms for special guests.

Regional examples of hammams

Jordan 

Jordan contains several hammams from the Umayyad era (7th to 8th centuries), making them the oldest known examples of Islamic bathhouses. Many of these are attached to the so-called "desert castles", including Qusayr 'Amra, Hammam al-Sarah, and Qasr al-Hayr al-Sharqi. Qusayr 'Amra is particularly notable for the frescoes in late Roman style that decorate the chambers, presenting a highly important example of Islamic art in its early historical stages.

Morocco

The ruins of the oldest known Islamic hammam in Morocco, dating back to the late 8th century, can be found in Volubilis. Many historic hammams have been preserved in cities such as Marrakesh and especially Fes, partly because they continue to be used by locals. Among the best known examples is the 14th-century Saffarin Hammam in Fes, which has been restored and rehabilitated. Moroccan hammams were typically smaller than Roman or Byzantine baths. They are often close to mosques to facilitate the performance of ablutions. Because of their private nature, their entrances are often discreet and their façades are typically windowless. Vestiges of the Roman bathing style can be seen in the three-room layout, which was widespread during the Roman/Byzantine period.

It's sometimes difficult to identify hammams from the outside but the roof has a series of characteristic domes that indicate the different chambers. They often occupy irregularly shaped plots to fit into the dense urban fabric. They are significant sites of culture and socialisation as they are integrated into city life in proximity to mosques, madrasas (schools) and souqs (markets). Magda Sibley, an expert on Islamic public baths, wrote that many specialists in Islamic architecture and urbanism found the hammams to be second in importance only to the mosques as the most significant buildings in Islamic medinas (historic cities).

Al-Andalus (Spain and Portugal) 

Although the traditions of the hammams eventually disappeared in the centuries after the end of Muslim rule on the Iberian Peninsula in 1492, many historic hammam structures have nonetheless been preserved to varying degrees across many cities, especially in Spain. Many of them are now archeological sites or open to tourists as historical attractions. These hammams are partly distinguished from others by their larger and more monumental warm rooms (bayt al-wastani) and changing rooms (bayt al-maslaj), a feature also shared with some Moroccan hammams.

An early example (partially destroyed now) were the 10th-century Caliphal Baths which were attached to the Umayyad royal palace of Cordoba (later turned into the Christian Alcazar) and later expanded by the Almohads (12th to early 13th centuries). Other notable examples of preserved Andalusian baths include the Bañuelo of Granada, the Arab Baths of Ronda, the Arab Baths of Jaén, and the baths in the Alcazar of Jerez de la Frontera. The Alhambra of Granada also contains two preserved bathhouses: a small one near its main mosque, and a much more lavish one attached to the Comares Palace. In 2020 a well-preserved 12th-century Almohad-period bathhouse, complete with painted geometric decoration, was discovered during renovations of a local tapas bar in Seville, near the Giralda tower.

Syria
A legend claims that Damascus once had 365 hammams, one for each day of the year. For centuries, these hammams formed an integral part of community life and some 50 of those in Damascus survived until the 1950s. However, by 2012, as a result of modernisation and the installation of home bathrooms, fewer than twenty Damascene hammams were still working.

According to many historians, Aleppo was home to 177 medieval hammams before the Mongol invasion when many of the city's vital structures were destroyed. Until 1970, around forty hammams were still operating. In 2010, before the start of the Syrian War, roughly eighteen hammams still operated in the ancient part of the city. Notable examples included:
Hammam al-Sultan, built in 1211 by Az-Zahir Ghazi
Hammam al-Nahhasin, built during the 12th century near Khan al-Nahhaseen
Hammam al-Bayadah, built in 1450 during the Mamluk era
Hammam Yalbugha built in 1491 by the Emir of Aleppo Saif ad-Din Yalbugha al-Naseri
Hammam al-Jawhary, Gammam Azdemir, Hammam Bahram Pasha, Hammam Bab al-Ahmar and others

Egypt

As in neighbouring regions, bathhouses had existed in Egypt for centuries before the arrival of the Arab Muslims in Egypt in the 7th century. Greek bathhouses were present in Alexandria, a capital of Hellenistic culture, as well as in other cities like Karanis in the Faiyum. During the subsequent Islamic period, bathhouses continued to be built by Muslim rulers and patrons, sometimes as part of larger religious and civic complexes. Although not many have survived intact to the present day, numerous public baths were built by the Fatimids (10th–12th centuries), the Ayyubids (12th–13th centuries), the Mamluks (13th–16th centuries), and the Ottomans (16th–19th centuries). One well-preserved medieval example is the restored Hammam of Sultan Inal, dating from 1456 and located at Bayn al-Qasrayn in Cairo. Private hammams were also built as part of palaces, with surviving examples at the Palace of Amir Taz (14th century) and the Harim Palace (19th century), and of local aristocratic mansions such as Bayt al-Razzaz (15th–18th centuries) and Bayt al-Suhaymi (17th–18th centuries). In many Egyptian hammams a pool of hot water is present in the hot room and used for immersion and bathing, a feature shared with the hammams of Iran.

Today, the cultural practice of visiting hammams has significantly receded in Egypt. Cairo contained an estimated 77 operational hammams at the beginning of the 19th century, but only 33 were operating in 1969 and only eight were still operating at the start of the 21st century, with many others abandoned or neglected. Of the few still functioning hammams, many are also in precarious condition and scholars have indicated that they are likely to disappear or stop functioning in the near future. A few hammams, mainly in the neighbourhoods of Historic Cairo, have been restored or earmarked for restoration as historic monuments, including the Sultan Inal Hammam, the monumental but ruined hammam of Sultan al-Mu'ayyad (behind the al-Mu'ayyad Mosque), the Hammam al-Gamaliyya (in the Gamaliya neighbourhood), the Hammam al-Sinaniya (in Bulaq), and the Hammam al-Sukariya (in Darb al-Ahmar).

Turkey

Public baths were a feature of life in Turkey in Ancient Greek and Roman times, and the Seljuk Turks continued to build hammams here. The majority of historic hammams, however, survive from the Ottoman period (14th–20th centuries). Many examples of early Ottoman hammams remain, particularly in the early Ottoman capitals of Edirne and Bursa, where many of their early structural and decorative features were established. Many were built in association with particular mosques or religious complexes (külliyes). Notable examples from the pre-1453 period include the Orhan Bey Hamam in Bursa (built around 1339), the Demirtaş Hamam in Bursa (14th century), the Hacı Hamza Hamam in Iznik (late 14th or early 15th century), the Çelebi Sultan Mehmet Hamam in Merzifon (1413), the Mahkeme Hamam in Bursa (1421), the Gazi Mihal Hamam in Edirne (1422, now partly ruined), the Emir Sultan Hamam in Bursa (1426), the Beylerbeyi Hamam in Edirne (1429, now partly ruined), and the Karacabey Hamam in Ankara (1444).After the conquest of Constantinople in 1453, Istanbul became a centre of Ottoman architectural patronage. The city's oldest hammams include the Tahtakale Hamam (built soon after 1453), the Mahmut Pasha Hamam (built in 1466 and part of the Mahmut Pasha Mosque complex), the Gedik Ahmet Pasha Hamam (built in 1475), the Bayezid II Hamam (built some time between 1500 and 1507), and the Küçük Mustafa Pasha Hamam (built before 1512 near the Gül Mosque).

Several major hammams in the city were designed by the famous Ottoman architect Mimar Sinan in the 16th century. These include the Çinili Hamam (built in 1545 in the Zeyrek neighbourhood), the Süleymaniye Hammam (part of the Süleymaniye Mosque complex built in 1550–1557), the Mihrimah Sultan Hamam (part of the Mihrimah Sultan Mosque complex built in 1562–1565), the Kılıç Ali Pasha Hamam (part of the Kılıç Ali Pasha Complex completed in 1580), as well as a lesser-known but architecturally interesting hammam in Ortaköy. The Çemberlitaş Hamam (on Divanyolu Street in the Çemberlitaş neighbourhood), completed in 1584 or earlier, is also attributed to Mimar Sinan. The largest hammam designed by Sinan is the Haseki Hürrem Sultan Hamam which was commissioned by Süleyman I's consort, Hürrem Sultan, and completed in 1556 on the site of the historical Baths of Zeuxippus for the religious community of the nearby Hagia Sophia. Outside Istanbul, Sinan also designed the Sokullu Mehmet Pasha Hamam in Edirne around 1568–1569. Among the hammams built after the 16th century one of the most famous is the Cağaloğlu Hamam, finished in 1741 and one of the last major hammams to be built in Istanbul.

Turkey also has a number of hot springs which have been developed as public baths for centuries. The Eski Kaplıca ("Old Thermal Baths") of Bursa, built by Sultan Murad I (ruled 1360–1389), and the nearby Yeni ("New") Kaplıca built by Rüstem Pasha in 1552, are two of the most notable examples and are still used today. Several older hot-spring baths were also built by the Seljuks in the 13th century and the Akkoyunlu in the late 14th century, some of which are still operating today.

Although far fewer in number than in the past, many Turkish hammams still operate today. With the growth in tourism, some have been restored or modernised recently with differing degrees of historical authenticity. Other hammam buildings have ceased functioning as public baths but have been repurposed as markets or cultural venues, as for example the Tahtakale Hamam in Istanbul which contains shops and cafes, the Hoca Paşa Hamam in Istanbul which is used for performances by whirling dervishes, the Küçük Mustafa Paşa Hamamı in Istanbul which is used for art exhibitions, and the Orhan Bey Hamam in Bursa which is part of the Covered Bazaar. In some cases hamam buildings have been turned into storage depots or factories, though this has usually led to neglect and damage to their historic fabric.

Greece

Greece once had many historic hammams dating from the Ottoman period, from the late 14th century to the 18th century. Two of the oldest remaining examples are the Gazi Evrenos Hamam in Giannitsa, dating from 1392, and the Oruç Pasha Hammam in Didymoteicho, dating from 1398. Most have been abandoned, demolished or survive in a state of decay, but recently a growing number have been restored and converted to serve new cultural functions as historic sites or exhibitions spaces. A 2004 study by Elena Kanetaki counted 60 remaining hammam buildings on Greek territory.In Thessaloniki, formerly a major Ottoman city, the Bey Hamam was built in 1444 by Sultan Murad II. It is a double bath, for men and women, with notable architectural decoration. The baths remained in use, called the Baths of Paradise, until 1968. They were restored by the Greek Archaeological Service and are now used as a cultural venue. The late 16th-century Yeni Hamam has also been partially restored and now serves as a music venue. The Pasha Hamam, also known as the Phoenix Baths, was built circa 1520 or 1529 during the reign of Suleiman the Magnificent and operated until 1981. It now houses archeological finds from construction work for the Thessaloniki metro.

Elsewhere in Greece, the Abid Efendi Hamam, built between 1430 and 1669 near the Roman Forum in Athens, restored in the 1990s and converted to the Center of Documentation in Body Embellishment. In Rhodes, a double bath called the Yeni Hamam dates from the 16th century and was restored in 1992–1995. It is now one of only two Turkish baths still operating as a bathhouse in Greece.

Cyprus 
The Omeriye Baths in Nicosia/Lefkosia, Cyprus, date to the 15th century and form part of the larger complex of the Ömeriye Mosque (dedicated to the Caliph Omar). The complex was founded by Lala Mustafa Pasha in the 1570s, soon after the Ottoman conquest of Cyprus, repurposing the 14th-century Augustinian church of St. Mary which was damaged in the Ottoman siege. The hamam was restored in 2002–2004 as part of the Lefkosia Master Plan and is still in use today. In 2005 it won a Europa Nostra award for conservations.

On the Turkish side of the Cypriot border in Lefkoşa, the Büyük Hamamı dates from the same period and is still in operation for men and women.

North Macedonia 
Some significant historic Ottoman hammams have also been preserved in North Macedonia. Two of the major examples in Skopje are now part of the National Gallery of Macedonia: the Daut Pasha Hamam (built in the late 15th century) and the Čifte Hammam (mid-15th century).

Bulgaria 
The city of Plovdiv, which was the most important city in the area during Ottoman rule, had eight baths in the mid-17th century when Evliya Çelebi visited. Of these, only two have survived . The best-preserved is the large Chifte Banya or Çifte Hamam (also known as the Ancient Bath), which now serves as an art gallery. It was built in the 1460s, probably by Isfandiyaroğlu Ismail Bey, the deposed ruler of the Isfendiyarid Beylik in Anatolia. It is one of the largest preserved Ottoman hammams in the Balkans and its decoration includes some muqarnas.

Hungary
Budapest, the 'City of Spas', has four Turkish baths, all from the 16th century: Rudas Baths, Király Baths, Rácz Thermal Bath, and Veli bej (Császár) Bath (reopened to the public in December 2012). Currently only Rudas and Veli bej are open to the public, Rácz was closed in 2003 while Király was closed in 2020 for renovations. Eger also has a working hammam, simply called Török Fürdő (Turkish Bath), from the early 17th century.

India and Pakistan
Public baths have ancient precedents in Indian civilisation. The Great Bath located in present-day Pakistan is a notable example dating from the 3rd millennium BC at the archeological site of Mohenjo-daro in the Indus Valley. Islamic hammams were introduced after the spread of Muslim rule in the subcontinent starting mainly with the Delhi Sultanate in the 13th century and continuing through the later Mughal period (16th–19th centuries). Historically, however, public bathhouses in the Indian subcontinent were less common and less important than in other Muslim territories such as the  Middle East and North Africa. This  was due to the fact that, unlike most cities in those regions, water was readily available across much of India, making hammams less essential for bathing and performing full ablutions. While there were many elaborate hammams in private palaces and mansions, few Indian hammams were as important as those of Muslim cities further west.

Delhi, Hyderabad and Bhopal in India still have multiple working Turkish baths, which date back to the Mughal period in the early 16th century. Two prominent examples are the Hammam-e-Qadimi and Hammam-e-Lal Qila.

In Pakistan, Shahi Hammam or the Royal Bathhouse of Lahore, located in the historic Walled City, is one of the best preserved examples of a Mughal-era hammam. It was built in 1634 by the Mughal governor of Lahore, Hakim Ilmuddin Ansari, during the reign of Emperor Shah Jahan.

Development of hammams in Great Britain, Ireland, Western Europe, the British Empire and the USA

By the mid 19th century, baths and wash houses in Britain took several forms. Turkish baths, based on Ottoman bathhouses, were introduced by David Urquhart, diplomat and sometime Member of Parliament (MP) for Stafford, who for political and personal reasons wished to popularise Turkish culture. In 1850, he wrote The Pillars of Hercules, describing his travels through Spain and Morocco in 1848. He outlined the system of baths used there and in the Ottoman Empire, which had changed little since Roman times. In 1856, Richard Barter read Urquhart's book and worked with him to construct a similar bath. Although it was not a success, Barter persevered, sending his architect to study the ancient baths in Rome. Later that year he opened the first modern Turkish bath at St Ann's Hydropathic Establishment near Blarney, County Cork, Ireland. The following year, the first public bath of its type to be built in mainland Britain since Roman times was opened in Manchester, and the idea spread rapidly. It reached London in July 1860, when Roger Evans, a member of one of Urquhart's Foreign Affairs Committees, opened a Turkish bath at 5 Bell Street, near Marble Arch.

During the following 150 years, over 800 Turkish baths opened in the country, including those built by municipal authorities as part of swimming-pool complexes, taking advantage of the fact that water-heating boilers were already on site.

Similar baths opened in other parts of the British Empire. Dr. John Le Gay Brereton, who had given medical advice to bathers in a Foreign Affairs Committee-owned Turkish bath in Bradford, travelled to Sydney, Australia, and opened a Turkish bath there on Spring Street in 1859, even before such baths had reached London.  Canada had one by 1869, and the first in New Zealand was opened in 1874.

Urquhart's influence was also felt outside the Empire when in 1861, Dr Charles H Shepard opened the first Turkish baths in the United States at 63 Columbia Street, Brooklyn Heights, New York City, most probably on 3 October 1863. Before that, the United States, like many other places, had several Russian baths, one of the first being that opened in 1861 by M. Hlasko at his "natatorium" at 219 S. Broad Street, Philadelphia. In Germany in 1877, Frederick I, Grand Duke of Baden opened the Friedrichsbad Roman-Irish baths in Baden-Baden. This was also based on the Victorian Turkish bath, and is still open today.

 there were just eleven Victorian or Victorian-style Turkish baths remaining open in Britain, including the baths in Harrogate, but hot-air baths still thrive in the form of the Russian steambath and the Finnish sauna. A few of Britain's Turkish baths, while retaining their original decorative style, are now used for other purposes, such as day spas, restaurants, events venues and business centres.

Cultural representations of the Turkish bath

Art 
Within the Muslim world, hammams appeared in some artistic depictions such as Persian miniatures, including the work of Kamāl ud-Dīn Behzād (or Bihzad).

In Western art, especially in the context of 19th-century Orientalism, the hammam is often portrayed as a place of sexual looseness, disinhibition and mystery. These Orientalist ideas paint the Arab or Turkish "other" as mystical and sensuous, lacking morality in comparison to their Western counterparts. A famous painting by Jean Auguste Dominique Ingres, Le Bain Turc ("The Turkish Bath"), depicts these spaces as magical and sexual. There are several women touching themselves or one another sensually while some dance to music played by the woman in the centre of the painting.

Movies 
Turkish director Ferzan Özpetek's 1997 film Hamam told the story of a man who inherited a hammam in Istanbul from his aunt, restored it and found a new life for himself in the process.

Literature 
Visiting a hammam was very much a part of the Western tourist experience from the 18th century onwards and many travellers left accounts of what they had seen in the bathhouses. One such was the British diplomat's wife, Lady Mary Wortley Montagu, who visited a hammam in Sofia in Bulgaria in 1717 and wrote about it in her Turkish Embassy Letters, first published in 1763. In 1836 another British woman, the traveller and novelist, Julia Pardoe, left a description of taking part in the hammam ritual in Constantinople/Istanbul in her book The City of the Sultan and Domestic Manners of the Turks, published in 1838. In 1814 another wife of a British ambassador to the Ottoman Empire, Henrietta Liston, visited a hammam in Bursa and wrote about it in her belatedly published diary. In her Romance of the Bosphorus, Dorina Clifton, a British woman who grew up in Constantinople/Istanbul, left a rare account of a visit to a local hammam in Kandilli, one of the Bosphorus villages, before the First World War. Several more contemporary accounts of using hammams in Turkey appeared in Tales from the Expat Harem, published in 2005.

See also

Gellért Baths
Hydrotherapy
Jjimjilbang, the Korean equivalent
Onsen and sentō, the Japanese equivalents
Steam shower
Sauna

References

Primary bibliography
 (Deals only with the Victorian Turkish bath)
 (Deals only with the Victorian Turkish bath)

External links

Michael Palin at Turkish baths in Istanbul – BBC (From Pole to Pole) uploaded by BBC Worldwide to YouTube
The Turkish Bath Experience
Victorian Turkish baths: their origin, development, & gradual decline

Bathing

Islamic architecture
Ottoman architecture
Turkish culture
Turkish inventions
Sauna
Architecture in Iran